The South Carolina National Heritage Corridor is a federally designated National Heritage Area extending from the Appalachian Mountains to Charleston through seventeen counties of South Carolina. The heritage corridor promotes and interprets the state's history, with emphasis on European settlement, agriculture, Black history, trade routes and the state's ports.  Sites associated with the American Revolution and the American Civil War are also included.

The South Carolina National Heritage Corridor was established in 1996.

References

External links
 South Carolina National Heritage Corridor official website

National Heritage Areas of the United States
1996 establishments in South Carolina
Protected areas established in 1996
Protected areas of South Carolina
South Carolina in the American Civil War
South Carolina in the American Revolution